Rabbi Ya'akov-Michael Hasani (27 June 1913 – 2 July 1975) was an Israeli politician who served as Minister of Welfare during two spells in the early 1970s.

Biography
Born Ya'akov Kantrovich in Będzin in Poland (Russian Empire), Hasani studied at a yeshiva and was certified as a rabbi. He made aliyah in 1932 and was involved in the Haganah.

In 1951 he was elected to the Knesset on the Hapoel HaMizrachi list. He was re-elected in 1955, 1959 (by which time the party had merged into the National Religious Party), 1961, 1965 and 1969. In December 1969 he became Deputy Minister of Education and Culture, serving until 1 September 1970, when he was appointed Minister of Welfare. He remained minister After the 1973 elections, he retained his seat in the Knesset and continued in office as Minister of Welfare. However, less than a month after the government was formed, Hasani left the cabinet on 4 April 1974. He returned as Minister of Welfare in October that year, serving until his death in July 1975.

External links
 

1913 births
1975 deaths
People from Będzin
Polish emigrants to Israel
Haganah members
Hapoel HaMizrachi politicians
National Religious Party politicians
Burials at the Jewish cemetery on the Mount of Olives
People from the Province of Silesia
Members of the 2nd Knesset (1951–1955)
Members of the 3rd Knesset (1955–1959)
Members of the 4th Knesset (1959–1961)
Members of the 5th Knesset (1961–1965)
Members of the 6th Knesset (1965–1969)
Members of the 7th Knesset (1969–1974)
Members of the 8th Knesset (1974–1977)
Deputy ministers of Israel